Brigadier General Robert Walter Mearns (July 16, 1866 – May 23, 1949) was a U.S. Army general during World War I.

Early life and education
Robert Walter Mearns was born on July 16, 1866, in Kemblesville, Pennsylvania, to Andrew James Mearns, a farmer, and Martha Kennedy Mearns. He attended the West Chester Normal School, then entered the United States Military Academy and graduated number sixty-one of sixty-two in the class of 1892, one of thirteen who took five years to complete the requirements. Mearns later graduated from the Infantry and Cavalry School in 1897.

Military career
He was commissioned in the 20th Infantry on duty at Fort Assinniboine, Montana, and later, at Fort Leavenworth, Kansas.

During the Spanish–American War, his regiment was sent to Cuba. Mearns participated in the Battle of El Caney and earned the Silver Star. After the war, his regiment was sent to the Philippines.

Mearns was promoted to major and commanded the Philippine Scouts from February 28, 1905, to December 8, 1909.

Mearns was promoted to lieutenant colonel effective May 15, 1917. During World War I, he received a temporary promotion to colonel on August 16, 1917 and to brigadier general on October 12, 1918. From November 1, 1918 to February 5, 1919, he served as commanding general of the 17th Infantry Division at Camp Beauregard in Louisiana.

After the war, Mearns reverted to his permanent rank of lieutenant colonel on February 6, 1919. He was promoted to colonel effective July 1, 1920 and retired from active duty on December 31, 1922. On June 21, 1930, Mearns was advanced to brigadier general on the retired list.

Personal life
Mearns married Ethel Janet Brown on June 5, 1913. Together they had three sons, Robert, Fillmore and James. He was a Presbyterian and enjoyed riding horses, golfing and motoring.

Mearns and his wife settled in Berkeley, California after his retirement. He died at the age of eight-two at Letterman General Hospital in San Francisco on May 23, 1949. Mearns was buried at San Francisco National Cemetery.

References

1866 births
1949 deaths
People from Chester County, Pennsylvania
West Chester University alumni
United States Military Academy alumni
Military personnel from Pennsylvania
United States Army Command and General Staff College alumni
American military personnel of the Spanish–American War
Recipients of the Silver Star
American military personnel of the Philippine–American War
United States Army generals of World War I
United States Army generals
People from Berkeley, California
Burials at San Francisco National Cemetery